Oleg Aleksandrovich Lidrik (born 17 May 1971) is a Russian professional football official and a former player. He is the president of FC Baikal Irkutsk.

Honours
 Russian Second Division Zone East top scorer: 2002 (22 goals).

External links
 

1971 births
Sportspeople from Irkutsk
Living people
Soviet footballers
Russian footballers
FC Sibir Novosibirsk players
FC Zvezda Irkutsk players
Association football forwards
Association football midfielders
FC Novokuznetsk players